FC Neunkirch is a Swiss women's association football club based in Neunkirch, a municipality in the canton of Schaffhausen. From 2007 the club was promoted in several consecutive seasons, reaching the top division Nationalliga A in 2013. The club has an associated men's team who play in the lower leagues.

In 2016–17 the team won its first national title.

History
The football club was founded in 1963. A women's team only started playing in the league system in 2006. After four promotions in the next seven years the team reached the top level Nationalliga A.

The team ended the 2013–14 season in fourth place, third in the next season, and finished runners-up to Zürich in 2015–16.

In 2015 FC Neunkirch reached the semi-final of the Swiss Women's Cup. The team was leading FC Basel 1–0 when they were reduced to 10 players after their goalkeeper was shown a red card after 16 minutes. They eventually lost 2–1.

After ten out of ten wins in the 2016–17 season they stood in first place. The team received some criticism for their lack of youth teams and because only 4 players from a 21-woman squad were Swiss. They finished the season as champions and also won the 2017 cup final.

Days after winning the double, the club withdrew their team from the Nationalliga A. Estimated costs of over €500,000  for the next season proved too much for the club.

Current squad

Former players
For details of current and former players, see :Category:FC Neunkirch players.

References

External links
 Official website 

Association football clubs established in 1963
Women's football clubs in Switzerland
1963 establishments in Switzerland